HMP New Hall is a Closed Category prison for female adults, juveniles and young offenders. The prison is located in the village of Flockton (near Wakefield) in West Yorkshire, England. New Hall is operated by His Majesty's Prison Service.

History
In 1933, New Hall became the first prison to implement the then-experimental Open Prison system. This was seen as a potential method for dealing with the combined problems of the rising numbers of prisoners and the lack of proper employment for them. At first, the prison was populated by prisoners from HMP Wakefield who were soon due to be released, but in 1961 the prison became a Senior Detention Centre for male young offenders. It was during this time that, on some occasions, the 'Short, sharp shock' regime was introduced. In 1987 the prison was assigned to serve a different population, when it was re-designated for a second time to become a women's prison.

In 1999, the BBC programme Jailbirds was filmed at the prison with the producers being given unlimited access to the inmates for a period of eight months.

The prison today
Currently, New Hall is a closed female local prison which holds all categories of adult female prisoners. Beside this, it caters for  young offenders and juveniles who are on Detention and Training Orders. Accommodation at the prison is mainly in cells. There is a mother & baby unit, health care centre, segregation unit and some dormitories.

This prison provides full and part-time education courses for prisoners in areas such as business administration, food hygiene, literacy, numeracy and information technology, NVQ Hairdressing, BTEC and Art. New Hall has workshops where inmates can be given experience of assembly work, light textile work, catering and gardening. Employment and careers advice by the Jobcentre Plus is also available. The prison's governor is Julia Spence. The Ministry of Justice has received planning permission to install solar panels at the site in a bid to reduce the prison's carbon footprint.

Notable inmates
Notable people held at the prison include:
 Sarah Barrass, mother who in 2019 murdered two of her children and attempted to murder four others via poisoning and strangulation
Tanya French, baby rapist (since released)
 Frankie Smith, mother who murdered her child Star Hobson in 2020 with her female partner Savannah Brockhill
 Katrina Walsh, killer
 Rosemary West, serial killer

References

External links
Ministry of Justice pages on New Hall
BBC Radio 4 programme about New Hall

Prisons in West Yorkshire
Women's prisons in England
Young Offender Institutions in England
Juvenile prisons in England